The Three Sisters is a variety of tomato, so named because the plant grows vegetables in three different shapes, each given plant producing only one of the three:
 a large single-pleated size (most common)
 a more cylindrical shape, like a Roma tomato
 a pleated, flattened globe type

References

See also
 List of tomato cultivars

Tomato cultivars